Club Baloncesto Peñas Huesca  is a Spanish professional Basketball team based in Huesca, Aragón. The team currently plays in league LEB Plata.

History
The team played in Liga ACB, where they stayed from 1983 to 1996. After winning the relegation play-off, the sold their spot in the league to Baloncesto Fuenlabrada and they joined the new second tier league, Liga LEB. One year later, the club left the league and started to play from the lowest divisions.

14 years later, CB Peñas came back to LEB Oro league (second tier) after winning a Liga EBA (champions of the Final Eight played in Palencia), a Copa LEB Plata against CD Huelva Baloncesto (89–67) and being runner-up of the league in the 2009–10 season, beating in the last playoffs series CB Tíjola.

In 2016, Peñas reached the finals of the promotion playoffs, but lost 0–3 in the series to Club Melilla Baloncesto.

Sponsorship naming 
During all its history, CB Peñas Huesca had several denominations by sponsorship reasons:

Players

Current roster

Depth chart

Season by season

Trophies and awards

Trophies
 2nd division championships: (2)
 1ª División B: (1) 1985
 Copa LEB Plata: (1)
 2010

Individual awards
All LEB Oro Team
 Marius Grigonis – 2014

Notable players
To appear in this section a player must have either:
– Set a club record or won an individual award as a professional player.
– Played at least one official international match for his senior national team.
  Marius Grigonis
  Rimas Kurtinaitis
  Tadas Sedekerskis
  Gabrielius Maldūnas
  Stojan Gjuroski
  Robinson Opong
  Alphonso Ford

External links 
 

Basketball teams in Aragon
LEB Oro teams
Former Liga ACB teams
Sport in Huesca